Cosquin' may refer to 

a place
 Cosquín, Córdoba, a small town in Argentina 

a festival
 Cosquín Festival

a river
 Cosquín River

a surname
 Emmanuel Cosquin (1841 – 1919), French folklorist.